In 1951, the United States FBI, under Director J. Edgar Hoover, continued for a second year to maintain a public list of the people it regarded as the Ten Most Wanted Fugitives.

As 1951 began, only three of the original top ten fugitives from the prior year still remained at large. The FBI had also added six additional fugitives to the list during the prior year, and had already caught one of those as well. As a result of the late year captures in 1950, 1951 began with only eight wanted fugitives named on the list. However, as soon as the second week of the new year began, the FBI promptly filled the two open slots with two new fugitives.

1951 fugitives
The "Ten Most Wanted Fugitives" listed by the FBI in 1951 include (in FBI list appearance sequence order):

Courtney Townshend Taylor
January 8, 1951 #17
One month on the list
Courtney Townshend Taylor - U.S. prisoner apprehended February 16, 1951, in Mobile, Alabama, after a jeweler recognized him from a wanted flyer, sent his clerk to follow Taylor, and then called the FBI and police. Within twenty-five minutes Taylor was in custody.

Joseph Franklin Bent
January 9, 1951 #18
Two years on the list
Joseph Franklin Bent - U.S. prisoner arrested August 29, 1952, in Texas City, Texas; he was shot and wounded during the arrest while attempting to draw his weapon; a citizen had recognized his photo in Pageant magazine.

Harry H. Burton
March 9, 1951 #19
One year on the list
Harry H. Burton - ACQUITTED of murder when witnesses testified he was at his dying mother's bedside at the time of the murder;  was arrested February 7, 1952, in Cody, Wyoming, by the local sheriff and FBI; had been featured on the True Detective Mysteries radio show.

Joseph Paul Cato
June 27, 1951 #20
Surrendered before publication
Joseph Paul Cato - U.S. prisoner surrendered to the FBI June 21, 1951, in Cleveland, Ohio, after seeing his own Identification Order; had been approved to be placed on the "Top Ten" list, but surrendered prior to the press release date

Anthony Brancato
June 27, 1951 #21
Two days on the list
Anthony Brancato - U.S. prisoner surrendered to the FBI June 29, 1951, in San Francisco, California, after seeing the
INS news story in the San Francisco Call-Bulletin. Brancato was the primary suspect of the group of robbers who robbed the sports and race book at the Flamingo Hotel-Casino in Las Vegas, Nevada. Broncato soon bailed out, and was murdered about 6 weeks later on August 7. 1951, by Los Angeles Mafia capo Jimmy Fratianno, who confessed to the famous Two Tonys murders in his book, The Last Mafioso

Frederick Emerson Peters
July 2, 1951 #22
Seven months on the list
Frederick Emerson Peters - U.S. prisoner arrested January 15, 1952, in a Washington, D. C. hotel lobby after two FBI agents
recognized him from the Identification Order; further research would be needed to clarify if he was the same lifelong criminal Frederick Emerson Peters (1885–1959) who became infamous as an impostor of famous people dating back to 1902.

Ernest Tait
July 11, 1951 #23 and also appeared again as #133 in 1960
One day on the list
Ernest Tait - became Fugitive #133 in 1960; U.S. prisoner arrested July 12, 1951, in Miami, Florida, by the FBI as a direct result of an Associated Press story in the Miami Herald and the Miami Daily News; he later claimed that he had intended to shoot it out with the police but not with the FBI.

Ollie Gene Embry
July 25, 1951 #24
One month on the list
Ollie Gene Embry - U.S. prisoner arrested by FBI Agents August 5, 1951, while working as a local filling station attendant, in the process of fixing the automobile radiator of a citizen who saw his Identification Order in the Post Office, and recognized him.

Giachino Anthony Baccolla
August 20, 1951 #25
Four months on the list
Giachino Anthony Baccolla - U.S. prisoner arrested December 10, 1951, in New York City.

Raymond Edward Young
November 12, 1951 #26
Four days on the list
Raymond Edward Young - U.S. prisoner arrested November 16, 1951, in Denver, Colorado, while loading bread trucks on his night job at a bakery.

John Thomas Hill
December 10, 1951 #27
One year on the list
John Thomas Hill - U.S. prisoner arrested August 16, 1952, in Hamtramck, Michigan, while asleep in bed during a raid on
his home, after a citizen recognized him from a wanted flier.

George Arthur Heroux

December 19, 1951 #28
Seven months on the list
George Arthur Heroux - US PRISONER; was caught on July 25, 1952, at Miami, Florida; had been charged along with Gerhard Arthur Puff (Fugitive #30) on December 3, 1951, for bank robbery and both men were soon added to the Top Ten fugitives list; with Puff, he robbed the Johnson County National Bank and Trust Company of Prairie Village, Kansas, on October 25, 1951; had probably been the person who bailed out Puff on October 17, 1951;  was released from jail on August 23, 1951; had met Puff while in Milwaukee County Jail, after Puff was arrested May 2, 1951, for armed robbery.

Later entries
FBI Ten Most Wanted Fugitives, 2020s
FBI Ten Most Wanted Fugitives, 2010s
FBI Ten Most Wanted Fugitives, 2000s
FBI Ten Most Wanted Fugitives, 1990s
FBI Ten Most Wanted Fugitives, 1980s
FBI Ten Most Wanted Fugitives, 1970s
FBI Ten Most Wanted Fugitives, 1960s
FBI Ten Most Wanted Fugitives, 1950s

External links
Current FBI top ten most wanted fugitives at FBI site
FBI pdf source document listing all Ten Most Wanted year by year (removed by FBI)

1951 in the United States